Jerry Umberger (born 21 January 1942) is a former American professional darts player, who played in Professional Darts Corporation events. He used the nickname Tucker.

Career
From Pennsylvania, Umberger first competed in the BDO World Darts Championship in 1981, where he lost 2-0 to Cliff Lazarenko in the last 16, a round he would reach again in 1983, this time losing to Tony Brown.

Umberger runner up on 1981 Los Angeles Open but he lost to John Corfe of Wales.

After switching to the PDC, he was brought in to make up the numbers in the inaugural 1994 WDC World Darts Championship, and lost a group match against Peter Evison, before beating Kevin Burrows.

World Championship performances

BDO
 1981: Second round (lost to Cliff Lazarenko 0–2) (sets)
 1982: First round (lost to Doug McCarthy 0–2)
 1983: Second round (lost to Tony Brown 0–3)
 1985: First round (lost to Alan Glazier 0–2)

PDC
 1994: Last 24 Group (lost to Peter Evison 0–3) and (beat Kevin Burrows 3–0)
 1995: Last 24 Group (lost to Bob Anderson 1–3) and (beat Ritchie Gardner 3-1)

References

External links

1942 births
Living people
Sportspeople from Pennsylvania
American darts players
Professional Darts Corporation early era players